William Taylor (20 November 1818 – 21 June 1903) was a pastoralist and politician in colonial Victoria (Australia), a member of the Victorian Legislative Council.

Taylor was born in Glasgow, Lanarkshire, Scotland, the son of William Taylor, a merchant, and Martha, nee Kirkwood. Taylor junior was educated at the High School of Glasgow.

Taylor decided to emigrate and arrived in the Port Phillip District on 7 August 1840.

Taylor was elected to the seat of Wimmera in on 16 August 1854, replacing William Splatt who resigned. Taylor was sworn-in in September remained a member until the original Council was abolished in March 1856.

Taylor was elected to the Southern Province of the new Legislative Council in April 1864, a seat he held until September 1866.

Taylor was president of the Keilor shire council 1874–1882 and 1884–1894. Taylor was a director of the Union Mortgage & Agency Co.; he also was a member of the Ormond College council, donating £200 and creating a scholarship for the College. Taylor died in Keilor, Victoria, Australia, on 21 June 1903; he was survived by his wife, six sons and four daughters.

References

 

1818 births
1903 deaths
Members of the Victorian Legislative Council
Scottish emigrants to Australia
Politicians from Glasgow
19th-century Australian politicians